The 1914 Mississippi College Collegians football team represented Mississippi College as a member of the Southern Intercollegiate Athletic Association during the 1914 college football season. Led by second-year head coach Dana X. Bible, Mississippi College compiled an overall record of 4–3–1 with a mark of 0–1–1 in conference play.

Schedule

References

Mississippi College
Mississippi College Choctaws football seasons
Mississippi College Collegians football